Yusuke Goto (後藤 優介, born April 23, 1993) is a Japanese football player for Shimizu S-Pulse.

Club statistics
Updated to 24 July 2022.

References

External links
Profile at Oita Trinita

1993 births
Living people
Association football people from Kagoshima Prefecture
Japanese footballers
J1 League players
J2 League players
J3 League players
Japan Football League players
Oita Trinita players
Verspah Oita players
J.League U-22 Selection players
Shimizu S-Pulse players
Association football forwards